Camp Mountain railway station is a railway station in Camp Mountain, Queensland,  Australia. The station opened in 1918 as part of the extension to Samford.

References

Railway stations in Australia opened in 1918
Railway stations in Queensland